Forum Communications Company is an American multimedia and technology company headquartered in Fargo, North Dakota. With multiple online and print news brands throughout Minnesota, North Dakota, South Dakota and Wisconsin, Forum Communications offers local news in a variety of digital and broadcast mediums in addition to various niche media brands covering specialty interests.

The company also owns four television stations in North Dakota, all affiliated with ABC. Additional offerings are commercial printing services and business services.

Leadership 
William "Bill" Marcil, Sr. is the current chairman of the board for Forum Communications Company, who is married to the founder, Norman B. Black's great-granddaughter.

Daily operations are overseen by William "Bill" Marcil, Jr. as the president and chief executive officer of Forum Communications Company as well as the publisher of The Forum of Fargo-Moorhead.

History 
Forum Communications Company began publishing its flagship newspaper The Forum of Fargo-Moorhead in 1878 and is currently owned and operated by the Marcil-Black family.

Today, Forum Communications Company offers multiple newspaper and multimedia journalism brands across four states in the upper Midwest along with several commercial printing facilities, TV broadcasting and business services.

Commercial 

 Click Content Studios offers marketing services through branded content for traditional and new media platforms.
 Forum Communications operates four printing plants in three states: Brainerd and Detroit Lakes, Minnesota; Sioux Falls, South Dakota; and a commercial plant at 4601 16th Ave. N. in Fargo, North Dakota. Commercial printing capabilities include: printing, mailing, fulfillment and various marketing services.
 JobsHQ is an online recruitment and digital advertising company focusing on employers and recruitment in Minnesota, North Dakota, South Dakota and Wisconsin.

Print and digital news
The following print and digital newspapers in Minnesota, Wisconsin, South Dakota, and North Dakota are part of the Forum Communications news network:
Alexandria Echo Press based in Alexandria, Minnesota, serves Douglas County, Minnesota, Todd County, Minnesota, central Minnesota and surrounding areas with a print newspaper, an e-paper and online news. The Echo Press was purchased by the Forum Communications Company in 1990.
The Bemidji Pioneer based in Bemidji, Minnesota, serves Beltrami County, Minnesota and surrounding areas with a print newspaper, an e-paper and online news. The Bemidji Pioneer was purchased by the Forum Communications Company in 1997.
Brainerd Dispatch based in Brainerd, Minnesota, serves Crow Wing County, Minnesota, central Minnesota and surrounding areas with a print newspaper, an e-paper and online news. The Brainerd Dispatch was purchased by the Forum Communications Company in 2010.
Detroit Lakes Tribune (known as DL-Online for online news) based in Detroit Lakes, Minnesota, serves Becker County, Minnesota and surrounding areas with a print newspaper, an e-paper and online news. The Detroit Lakes Tribune was purchased by the Forum Communications Company in 1985.
The Dickinson Press based in Dickinson, North Dakota, serves Stark County, North Dakota and surrounding areas with a print newspaper, an e-paper and online news. The Dickinson Press was purchased by the Forum Communications Company in 1995.
Duluth News Tribune based in Duluth, Minnesota, serves St. Louis County, Minnesota, greater northeast Minnesota, Lake County, Minnesota, The Boundary Waters and surrounding areas with a print newspaper, an e-paper and online news. The Duluth News Tribune was purchased by the Forum Communications Company in 2006.
The Forum of Fargo-Moorhead (known as InForum.com for online news) based in Fargo, North Dakota, serves Fargo, North Dakota, Moorhead, Minnesota and West Fargo, North Dakota including Cass County, North Dakota, Clay County, Minnesota, greater eastern North Dakota and Western Minnesota and surrounding areas with a print newspaper, an e-paper and online news. It is the original flagship news brand of the Forum Communications Company.
The Globe based in Worthington, Minnesota, serves Nobles County, Minnesota and surrounding areas with a print newspaper, an e-paper and online news. The Globe was purchased by the Forum Communications Company in 1995.
Grand Forks Herald based in Grand Forks, North Dakota, serves Grand Forks County, North Dakota, Polk County, Minnesota, greater eastern North Dakota and Western Minnesota and surrounding areas with a print newspaper, an e-paper and online news. The Grand Forks Herald was purchased by the Forum Communications Company in 2006.
The Jamestown Sun based in Jamestown, North Dakota, serves Stutsman County, North Dakota and surrounding areas with a print newspaper, an e-paper and online news. The Jamestown Sun was purchased by the Forum Communications Company in 2000.
The Mitchell Republic based in Mitchell, South Dakota, serves Davison County, South Dakota, Hanson County South Dakota and surrounding areas with a print newspaper, an e-paper and online news. The Mitchell Republic was purchased by the Forum Communications Company in 1995.
Park Rapids Enterprise based in Park Rapids, Minnesota, serves Hubbard County, Minnesota and surrounding areas with a print newspaper, an e-paper and online news. The Park Rapids Enterprise was purchased by the Forum Communications Company in 1985.
Perham Focus based in Perham, Minnesota, serves Otter Tail County, Minnesota, central Minnesota and surrounding areas with a print newspaper, an e-paper and online news. The Perham Focus was purchased by the Forum Communications Company in 2000.
Pine Journal based in Duluth, Minnesota, serves Cloquet, Minnesota, Carlton County, Minnesota and surrounding areas with a print newspaper, an e-paper and online news. The Pine Journal was purchased by the Forum Communications Company in 2006.
Pine and Lakes Echo Journal based in Brainerd, Minnesota, serves Pequot Lakes, Minnesota, Crow Wing County, Minnesota, central Minnesota and surrounding areas with a print newspaper, an e-paper and online news. The Pine and Lakes Echo Journal was purchased by the Forum Communications Company in 2014.
Post-Bulletin based in Rochester, Minnesota, serves Olmsted County, Minnesota, greater southeast Minnesota and surrounding areas with a print newspaper, an e-paper and online news. The Post Bulletin was purchased by the Forum Communications Company in 2019.
Superior Telegram based in Superior, Wisconsin, serves Douglas County, Wisconsin and surrounding areas with a print newspaper, an e-paper and online news. The Superior Telegram was purchased by the Forum Communications Company in 2006.
Wadena Pioneer Journal based in Wadena, Minnesota, serves Otter Tail County, Minnesota, Wadena County, Minnesota, central Minnesota and surrounding areas with a print newspaper, an e-paper and online news. The Wadena Pioneer Journal was purchased by the Forum Communications Company in 1990.
West Central Tribune based in Willmar, Minnesota, serves Kandiyohi County, Minnesota, central Minnesota and surrounding areas with a print newspaper, an e-paper and online news. The West Central Tribune was purchased by the Forum Communications Company in 1980.

Other media 

 Agweek is based in Fargo, North Dakota and merged with Agri News based in Rochester, Minnesota, and provides a weekly print magazine, a weekly TV show, a weekly podcast and daily agricultural news online.
 Bison Media Zone based in Fargo, North Dakota, covers North Dakota State University football team and other athletics with multiple livestream events, TV shows, podcasts and online news with hosts and sports journalists Dom Izzo, Jeff Kolpack and Eric Peterson.
 Dakota Spotlight is based in Fargo, North Dakota as a true crime podcast working to uncover the truth about unsolved cases in the region.
 NewsMD covers health news and insights from local individuals and independent health professionals as well as news from the Mayo Clinic, Sanford Health, Essentia Health and more.
 Northland Outdoors covers outdoor sports stories and news focusing on the upper Midwest with Minnesota, North Dakota, South Dakota and Wisconsin online news.
 On The Minds Of Moms is based in Fargo, North Dakota and provides a bi-monthly print magazine and online news for today's modern family.
 The Rink Live covers hockey news and information with a focus on collegiate hockey throughout Minnesota, North Dakota, South Dakota and Wisconsin with a podcast and online news.

Television stations

References

 
Mass media companies of the United States
Newspaper companies of the United States
Television broadcasting companies of the United States
Companies based in Fargo–Moorhead
Publishing companies established in 1878
Family-owned companies of the United States